John Eliakim Weeks (June 14, 1853 – September 10, 1949) was an American politician from Vermont. He served as the 61st governor of Vermont from 1927 to 1931.

Early life
Weeks was born in Salisbury, Vermont, on June 14, 1853, the son of Ebenezer Weeks and Elizabeth (Dyer) Weeks. He attended the county schools and Middlebury High School. He married Hattie J. Dyer of Salisbury in 1879.  She died in 1942, and they had no children.

Career

Weeks operated a farm and operated several other businesses, including growing and selling hay, raising and selling livestock, selling insurance, and appraising and settling estates.  He became president of the Addison County Trust Company and the Columbus Smith Trust Company, and served on the board of directors for both the Brandon National Bank and the National Bank of Middlebury.

A Republican, Weeks served as Addison County Assistant Judge from 1884 to 1886. He was a  member of the Vermont House of Representatives in 1888. He moved to Middlebury, Vermont in 1896 and that year was also elected to the Vermont State Senate.  In 1896 he was also elected trustee of the state industrial school (later named the Weeks School).  He served as Assistant Judge again from 1902 to 1904.  He returned to the Vermont House in 1912, and was Speaker from 1915 to 1917. Weeks became Director of State Institutions in 1917 and served until 1923. Weeks was Vermont's Commissioner of Public Welfare from 1923 to 1926.

Weeks was elected Governor in 1926.  In 1928 he became the first Vermont Governor elected to a second two-year term, arguing that he should be given an exemption from the Republican Party's Mountain Rule in order to oversee efforts to recover from the great flood of 1927.  Weeks served from January 6, 1927 to January 8, 1931. In addition to flood recovery efforts, the Weeks administration was marked by an average of forty-nine miles of road annually being paved on a pay-as-you-go basis.

In 1930, Weeks was elected to the United States House of Representatives from Vermont's 1st District.  This district was scheduled to be eliminated due to redistricting, and incumbent Republican Elbert S. Brigham was not running for reelection.  Weeks argued that serving one term and then retiring would be a fitting capstone to his career, and would ensure that two incumbent Republicans did not have to run against each other in a 1932 primary for Vermont's sole U.S. House seat.  Weeks won the seat and served one term, 1931 to 1933. After serving in Congress, Weeks returned to his Middlebury business interests.

Death
Weeks died in Middlebury on September 10, 1949. At 96 years and 88 days, he remains the longest lived of all Vermont governors.

He is interred at West Salisbury Cemetery, Salisbury, Vermont.

References

External links

The Political Graveyard

National Governors Association
Encyclopedia, Vermont Biography

Govtrack US Congress

1853 births
1949 deaths
People from Salisbury, Vermont
Vermont state court judges
Republican Party members of the Vermont House of Representatives
Speakers of the Vermont House of Representatives
Republican Party Vermont state senators
Republican Party governors of Vermont
Republican Party members of the United States House of Representatives from Vermont
People from Middlebury, Vermont